Bob Jones High School is a public high school in Madison, Alabama, United States. The school is a part of Madison City Schools. Despite its name, it is not affiliated with Bob Jones University of Greenville, South Carolina; rather, it is named after Robert E. Jones, Jr., who served the area in the United States House of Representatives from 1947 until 1977.

In 2007, Bob Jones High School was ranked by Newsweek in the top 5% of American High Schools. The school was ranked 1044 among the top 1200 high schools in the nation based on the number of Advanced Placement, Cambridge tests, and/or International Baccalaureate tests taken by all students at a school and then dividing by the number of graduating seniors. These students are nationally known for their scholastic aptitude, with eleven students having been selected as Presidential Scholars Program candidates in the last three years alone.

History

The school was named for former Alabama congressman Robert E. "Bob" Jones. (Originally the school was to be named for James Record, the former Alabama State Senator and Madison County Commission Chairman who suggested Jones for the honor instead.) The current principal is Sylvia Lambert, and the school is in Region 4 of class 7A in the AHSAA.

Bob Jones High School opened in 1974 at 1304 Hughes Road as a part of the Madison County School system. It remained a part of this system until 1998, when the Madison City Schools system was created.

In 1996, BJHS moved to a newly constructed building at 650 Hughes Road, leaving the previous building for Discovery Middle School. The school plans underestimated the rate at which Madison was growing, and a few years after moving to the new location, the 9th grade, traditionally part of the high school, had to be put into the middle schools to make room at the new building. A new wing has since been added to alleviate further growth problems.

In 2005, Robby Parker became the principal of Bob Jones.

When a second high school, James Clemens High School, was opened in 2012, the 9th grade was then moved back to the high schools.

In 2015, the district promoted Parker to be the assistant superintendent. Sylvia Lambert became the new principal of the high school that year.

Scheduling
Bob Jones High School operates on a four-block semesterial schedule and offers options such as dual enrollment and cooperative education (co-op) programs for those who qualify. School hours run from 8:15 a.m. to 3:27 p.m., Monday through Friday. Each class is 96 minutes long, with a 7-minute class change period. Between 1st and 2nd block there is "break" that is 10 minutes. Every Wednesday, the school offers a 55-minute class period called "Patriot Path" where students are free to participate in a unique activity they are interested in; classes ranging from student-led clubs, to knitting, to hearing a guest speaker are offered, and activities are always being added.

Faculty
The high school has a staff that includes many National Board certified teachers.

Scholarships
The Class of 2010 broke the school record for the dollar amount of scholarships awarded. More than $32 million in scholarships was offered to about 350 students.

Fine arts

Marching band
The Bob Jones Marching Patriot Band, competed in the Outback Bowl Marching Open Class Competition, and won 3rd place out of 18 participating high schools from all around the nation. The marching band received 1st in class, as well as Grand Champion in the Parade Competition of the Outback Bowl Band Festival held in Tampa, Florida. The Bob Jones Marching Patriot Band also competed in Field Show USA held in Washington, D.C. and claimed the Field Show USA Champions in October, 2011. The Bob Jones High School Marching Patriot Band returned to the Outback Bowl Band Festival in Tampa once again in 2013 with their competition field show entitled, 007: The 50th Anniversary and won Best in Class and Grand Champions once again.

Wind Ensemble
In the summer of 2016, Bob Jones Wind Ensemble was selected to perform at the state music educators conference. Educators from over the state of Alabama attended this conference. January 20, 2017 was the first time students at Bob Jones attended the conference to perform, and the second year in a school in the Madison City district was selected. Band director, Leigh Thomas, plans to do more with the band after this event.

Indoor Drumline
Directed by Assistant Director of bands, Kevin Smart, the Indoor Drumline at Bob Jones, competing in Scholastic Marching Open class, has been one of the top indoor percussion ensembles for the state of Alabama since 2001. Directed formerly by Keith Anderson, the drumline has won several competitions at the local and regional level, as well as having placed in competitions at the national level. In April 2008 the drumline competed in the Winter Guard International Championships for the first time in Dayton, Ohio. The drumline reached the finals in their class on their first try and placed 8th in the nation in the Scholastic Marching Open class. The drumline reached finals again in 2010 with their show, Center, placing in 7th with a score of 90.163.

Theater department
Bob Jones' theater department has won recognition and numerous awards at the Walter S. Trumbauer Theater Festival in recent years, in both group and individual events. Furthermore, the group has been a regular representative for the state of Alabama at the Southeastern Theatre Conference in the last decade, most recently in 2015 when the group's original play The Standard Deviation received 1st place.  They were led by former seniors Kayla Peel (BYU), Chance Novalis (UAB), Emeline Earman (Alabama), and Christopher Gunner (Alabama). The former head of the Drama Department at Bob Jones, B. Dwayne Craft, is well known throughout the state for his excellence in both the acting and technical aspects of theatre. He is notable for being the only director to ever win the South Eastern Theater Conference's high award, Best in Show, three times. The school also puts on a semi- annual Spring Musical, directed by Mary Davis, and draws in large audiences with each showing. All shows performed at Bob Jones are built and run by the students.

Bob Jones Track And Field

Air Force JROTC
Bob Jones High School has an AFJROTC unit (AL-20021), also known as the 'Blue Knights', that has been awarded the Air Force's Distinguished Unit Award for school years 2006-2007, 2007–2008, 2008–2009, 2016-2017, and 2017-2018. The corps includes over 100 cadets who serve both the school and community, as well as over 11 different teams that participate in local/ national level competitions. One of these teams is their Blue Knights Drill Team, which competed in the 2019 JROTC Open Drill Nationals in Dayton, Ohio, and took 5th place in the unarmed flight regulation drill sequence.

Athletics
Bob Jones High School is often noticed for the excellent athletic programs. For the 2006-2007 school year, Bob Jones finished 6th in the Birmingham News All-Sports rankings. For the 2007-2008 school year, Bob Jones finished 4th in the All-Sports rankings.

Football past records

The 2011 team featured 5-star linebacker Reggie Ragland who committed to play at Alabama and numerous other D-1 athletes. They were 9-0 until they ran into Hoover in the final week of the season losing 41-13. They defeated Tuscaloosa County in the first round of the play-offs then faced the same Hoover team but this time at home. Bob Jones was leading 17-13 at halftime but was unable to finish them off as they lost 26-17. Bob Jones has yet to lose a region game under head coach Kevin Rose in his three years at the school.

Math team
The Bob Jones High School Math Team is also one of its best programs. They have claimed both 3rd and 2nd-place trophies in national competition.

Boys' tennis
The boys' tennis team has been the Varsity State Doubles Champions for 3 years in a row.

Boys' golf
The boys' golf team has done well in years past; however, they have only been as far as Sub-state in the state playoffs recently. Sophomore Harrison Joyner led the team in scores at sub state with a 77. Also, as of March 27 of the 2012 season, they have won all of their matches and a tournament. They are led by six seniors, two of which who have earned scholarships (Ryan Bowie-Wallace State/Matt Shin-Martin Methodist). One junior, two sophomores and several freshmen make up the rest of the team.

Boys' cross-country
The boys' cross country team is one of the top teams in the nation, previously under the leadership of Coach Robin Gaines. He has produced Olympic medalist runners in his programs.

Stephen Baker, former coach at Westminster Christian Academy and Huntsville High School, took over as head coach for the 2014 season.

Men's soccer
The men's varsity soccer team made it to the third round of playoffs in 2012, ending the season with a record of 12-2-0 in Section VIII and 19-7-0 overall. The 2012 JV team only allowed one goal scored against them during the season. The 2015 varsity team went the majority of the season ranked as the number one team in the state, made it to the semifinals of state cup, and ended the season with a record of 20-4-2. The boys participate annually in the Island Cup in Orange Beach, Alabama in February. The men's soccer coaches are led by Uwe Spiller.

Girls' soccer
The girls' soccer team won the 2003 state championship by defeating Oak Mountain in penalty kicks.

Cheerleading
The Varsity Competition Cheerleaders are the five-time defending UCA National Champions. They won the Medium Varsity division (13-16 members) in 2006 and the Super Varsity division (21-30 members) in 2007, 2008, 2009, winning the Large Varsity division in 2010. They also won the AHSAA State Cheerleading Championship 6A division in 2003, 2004, 2005, 2006, 2008, and 2010.

Swimming
The boys swim team are the defending AHSAA State Champions, and have been AHSAA State Champions 8 times since 2004. In 2014, the boys won another State Championship, led by their "Captain-by-Committee" approach. While some Captains (such as Christopher Burrows) led workouts, other captains (including Christopher Gunner) would lead pre-meet cheers. Andrey Tretyakov (sophomore) recently achieved an Olympic Trial Time in the 100m butterfly, and has been invited to compete for a spot on the U.S. Olympic team in 2016. The girls' team became State Champions in 2007. They received 5th place in 2014.  Coach Mike Gunner attempts to instill the ideology of "count everything because everything counts." He has received Alabama coach of the year three times in the past decade.

Boys' basketball
In 2010, the boys' basketball team won the school's first ever Boys' Basketball State Championship (6A) after a 20-14 season, beating No. 1 Homewood High School 61-45 score in the finals.

Girls' basketball
In 2008, the girls' basketball team won the 6A State Championship for the first time in Birmingham where they beat Clay-Chalkville High School. The girls' team finished with a 35-2 record and was ranked #14 in the country by ESPN 
In 2009, the girls' team defended their 6A State Championship by defeating Hoover High School in the finals. In 2010, the Lady Patriots were defeated by Hoover High School in the state championship. These same two teams meet in the 2011 state finals with Bob Jones prevailing, capturing their third state championship in four years.

Wrestling
The Bob Jones Wrestling Team has placed in the Top 10 in the state for the past 11 years.  Individually wrestlers have won four State titles, 33 section championships, and had five All-Americans (Two Academic All Americans). The team has won over 20 Tournament Championships, including three AHSAA Section Championships.

Ice hockey (retired)
In 1999 Alabama started its high school hockey program, and since then Bob Jones has won one state championship and competed in three others. They play in the Huntsville Amateur Hockey Association, and mainly compete against Huntsville High School, Sparkman High School, Virgil Grissom High School, Pope John Paul II High School, and The Chargers (A team of players that do not go to any of the schools listed prior). The hockey program was later let go by the school and hasn’t yet returned as of December 2017.

Notable alumni

 Conner Cappelletti, Guam international soccer player.
 Grant Dayton, Major League Baseball pitcher who is a free agent. Won 2021 World Series with Atlanta Braves.
 Zach Harting, competitive swimmer who specializes in the butterfly and freestyle events.
Tega Ikoba, forward for the Portland Timbers of Major League Soccer (MLS).
 Candice Storey Lee, former women's basketball player and athletic director at Vanderbilt University.
 Ralph Malone, former National Football League (NFL) player and current president and CEO of Triana Industries.
 Reggie Ragland, linebacker for the Cleveland Browns of the National Football League. Won Super Bowl LIV with the Kansas City Chiefs.
 Levi Randolph (born 1992), basketball player for Hapoel Jerusalem of the Israeli Basketball Premier League.
 Trey Wingenter (born 1994), pitcher in the Detroit Tigers organization for Major League Baseball.

References

External links
Official school homepage

Public high schools in Alabama
Schools in Madison County, Alabama
Educational institutions established in 1974
1974 establishments in Alabama